Vasili Mikhailovich Kartsev (9 April 1920 – 11 April 1987) was a Soviet professional football player and coach.

Honours
 Soviet Top League champion: 1945, 1949.
 Soviet Top League runner-up: 1946, 1947, 1948, 1950.
 Soviet Cup finalist: 1945.

External links
 

1920 births
1987 deaths
Soviet footballers
Association football forwards
Soviet Top League players
FC Lokomotiv Moscow players
FC Dynamo Moscow players
Soviet football managers
People from Yegoryevsk
Sportspeople from Moscow Oblast